The action of 23 November 1650 was a minor naval battle between Spain and France, in which a small Spanish squadron of 6 galleys commanded by Don Francisco Fernández de la Cueva, Duke of Alburquerque, captured the entirety of a French squadron of galleons under the Baron de Ligny, near Cambrils, during the Franco-Spanish War (1635-1659). The French fleet consisted of a galleon of 500 tons and 30 cannons, 2 of 300 tons with 20 cannons, and the last of 300 tons and 16 cannons.

The French fleet was sent filled with provisions to help the defenders in the Siege of Tortosa, but the squadron of the Duke of Albuquerque, knowing the enemy's plans, intercepted the French by surprise, achieving a complete victory. This case is almost unique in naval history, 6 galleys with 30 guns in total, completely defeated a squadron of four galleons with 86 guns in total, and whose crew had been reinforced by 500 musketeers. The Spaniards captured all the artillery (2 pieces of artillery of campaign and 4 mortars), ammunition carts, flags, equipment (over 1,000 musketry), and supplies from the enemy.

King Philip IV of Spain personally congratulated the Duke of Albuquerque for the victory. On 4 December 1650, the French troops led by the Duke of Mercoeur finally capitulated to the Spanish forces commanded by the Marquis of Mortara at Tortosa.

See also
 Capture of the galleon Lion Couronné

References

Bibliography 
Israel, Jonathan. Conflicts of empires: Spain, the low countries and the struggle for world supremacy, 1585-1713 Hambledon Continuum Publishing (2003) 
 Rodríguez González, Agustín Ramón. Victorias por mar de los Españoles. Biblioteca de Historia. Madrid 2006.
Black, Jeremy. European warfare 1494-1660. Routledge. (2002) .
 Sanz, Fernando Martín. La política internacional de Felipe IV. Fernando Martín Sanz. (2003) .
 Mossèn Sanabre. La acción de Francia en Cataluña por la pugna de la hegemonia en Europa. Barcelona (1956)
 Castrillo González, Carmen. Catálogo de manuscritos de la Biblioteca Universitaria de Salamanca. Escrito por Biblioteca Universitaria de Salamanca.
 Muñoz i Sebastià, Joan Hilari/Querol Coll, Enric. La Guerra dels Segadors a Tortosa 1640-1651. Romanya-Valls SA (2004) 

Naval battles involving Spain
Naval battles involving France
Naval battles of the Franco-Spanish War (1635–1659)
Battles of the Reapers' War
Battles in Catalonia
Conflicts in 1650
1650 in Europe